The Locke Nature Reserve, also known as the Locke Estate, is an area of Crown land located on the coast of Geographe Bay near Caves Road approximately  west of the town of Busselton.

The estate was divided into 16 sites which have been leased to churches and community organisations at minimal rates. The presence of the church sites throughout the estate has led to the area being known locally as the "Holy Mile".

The Locke Estate provides low-cost accommodation along one of the most expensive real estate locations in the South West region of Western Australia. As an A-Class Reserve the land cannot be sold and has the highest level of protection. 

In 2018, a bridge was built from the reserve across the Buayanyup River to link two previously isolated populations of western ringtail possums.

References 

Nature reserves in Western Australia
Busselton